William J. Stone (birth unknown – death unknown) was an English rugby union and professional rugby league footballer who played in the 1910s and 1920s. He played at representative level for Great Britain and England, and at club level for Hull FC, as a three-quarter back. He was captain of Hull during the 1921–22 and 1922–23 seasons.

Stone was a blacksmith in Bream, Gloucestershire. He was "discovered" playing for the Bream's rugby union team by talent scouts from Hull F.C. rugby league club, he then moved to Beverley Road, Hull with his wife Gertie (née Brown), and his children; William Geoff (birth registered second ¼ 1923 in Hull district), Hilary (birth registered third ¼ 1924 in Hull district), and Esme M. (birth registered third ¼ 1934 in Sculcoates district).

Stone was selected to go on the 1920 Great Britain Lions tour of Australia and New Zealand. He won caps for Great Britain while at Hull in 1920 against Australia (3 matches), and New Zealand (3 matches), and in 1921-22 against Australia (2 matches).

Stone also won caps for England while at Hull in 1921 against Wales, Other Nationalities and Australia, in 1922 against Wales, in 1923 against Wales (2 matches).

Stone played  in Hull FC's 9-10 defeat by Rochdale Hornets in the 1922 Challenge Cup Final during the 1921–22 season at Headingley Rugby Stadium, Leeds, in front of a crowd of 34,827.

Hull F.C. were just one-point behind Rochdale Hornets when  Bob Taylor scored a try in the dying minutes, however Billy Stone was unable to score the conversion and Rochdale Hornets won the 1922 Challenge Cup.

References

External links
 (archived by web.archive.org) Stats → PastPlayers → S at hullfc.com
 (archived by web.archive.org) Statistics at hullfc.com

England national rugby league team players
English rugby league players
English rugby union players
Footballers who switched code
Great Britain national rugby league team players
Hull F.C. captains
Hull F.C. players
People from Bream, Gloucestershire
Place of birth missing
Place of death missing
Rugby league centres
Rugby league players from Gloucestershire
Rugby league wingers
Rugby union players from Gloucestershire
Year of birth missing
Year of death missing